Fanen Joseph Akyam (born 14 April 2000) is a Nigerian footballer.

Club career
On 21 February 2020 he joined Russian Premier League club FC Tambov.

References

External links

Profile at pressball.by

2000 births
Living people
Nigerian footballers
Association football forwards
FC Slutsk players
FC Tambov players
Belarusian Premier League players
Nigerian expatriate footballers
Expatriate footballers in Belarus
Expatriate footballers in Russia